Kapov (masculine; Russian: Капов, Belarusian: Капаў) or Kapova (feminine) may refer to
Kapov Han, a village in Bosnia and Herzegovina
Kapova Cave, a limestone karst cave in Bashkortostan, Russia
Jadranka Skorin-Kapov (born 1955), American-Croatian writer
Yawhen Kapaw (born 1977), Belarusian professional footballer